De Lasteyrie may refer to:

Jules de Lasteyrie (1810–1883), an owner of the Château de la Grange-Bléneau
Count Guy de Lasteyrie (1879–1944), a member of the de Lasteyrie nobility